The Group N-GT (National GT) (also known as Series Grand Touring Cars) was a motor racing category launched by the Fédération Internationale de l'Automobile in 2000. The first cars were homologated on 1 March, 2000 by Porsche and Ferrari. A total of eight different models from six marques were homologated throughout the class existence.

Technical specifications
Appendix J article 257 of the International Sporting Code states the Series Grand Touring Car definition as follows: "An open or closed automobile which has no more than one door on each side and a minimum of two seats situated one on each side of the longitudinal centre line of the car; these two seats must be crossed by the same transversal plane. This car must be adapted for racing on circuits or closed courses." The engine must be fitted with a production based engine with a capacity of up to 8.0L. The restrictor size was determined based on the cylinder capacity and the weight of the car.

Group NGT in competition
The Group NGT regulations were used in various GT competitions, mostly as a secondary class to Group GT class cars. An NGT class was added in the FIA GT Championship between 2000 and 2004. The class was later replaced by Group GT2 regulations. The Euro GT Championship and British GT Championship raced NGT class cars in the same class alongside Group GT2 class cars and/or Group GT class cars.

FIA GT NGT champions

FIA homologated Group NGT cars

References

Racing car classes
Grand tourers
Sports car racing
Fédération Internationale de l'Automobile